Bay of Plenty Regional Council is the administrative body responsible for overseeing regional land use, environmental management and civil defence in the Bay of Plenty Region of New Zealand's North Island.

It was founded as part of the 1989 New Zealand local government reforms. Whakatāne was selected as the seat for the council, as a compromise between the two dominant cities of Tauranga and Rotorua.

Regional parks

The council administers two regional parks.

 Onekawa Te Mawhai Regional Park
 Papamoa Hills Regional Park

References

External links
 Bay of Plenty Regional Council

Regional councils of New Zealand
Politics of the Bay of Plenty Region